Cieszyny may refer to the following places in Poland:
Cieszyny, Lower Silesian Voivodeship (south-west Poland)
Cieszyny, Kuyavian-Pomeranian Voivodeship (north-central Poland)